Chryseobacterium profundimaris  is a Gram-negative, strictly aerobic, rod-shaped and non-motile bacteria from the genus of Chryseobacterium which has been isolated from deep sea sediments from the Atlantic Ocean.

References

Further reading

External links
Type strain of Chryseobacterium profundimaris at BacDive -  the Bacterial Diversity Metadatabase

profundimaris
Bacteria described in 2015